The Clackmannan Group is the name given to a suite of rocks of late Dinantian and Namurian age laid down during the Carboniferous period in the Midland Valley of Scotland.

Description 
The Group comprises a lower unit of coarse sandstones, siltstones, mudstone, and limestones with thin coals and ironstones known as the Lower Limestone Formation, an overlying sequence of similar rocks known as the Limestone Coal Formation, then an Upper Limestone Formation and at its top the sandstones of the Passage Formation. This last formation also includes fireclays, siltstones, mudstones, ironstones, coal and seatrocks.

The Clackmannan Group conformably overlays the rocks of the Strathclyde Group and underlays the Coal Measures, this latter boundary also being conformable.

Paleontology 
Remains of the prehistoric shark †Cladodus elegans Newberry & Worthen, 1870 (braincase and a tooth) have been found in the Lower Limestone Formation.

See also 

 Fossil Grove

References 

Geological groups of the United Kingdom
Geologic formations of Scotland
Fossiliferous stratigraphic units of the United Kingdom
Carboniferous System of Europe
Carboniferous Scotland
Carboniferous southern paleotropical deposits